Kevin Bryant Cossom (born September 2, 1984) is an American singer, songwriter, and record producer. Born in Philadelphia and raised in Orlando, Florida, Cossom has written for a variety of artists including Keri Hilson ("Knock You Down" featuring Kanye West and Ne-Yo), DJ Khaled ("Do You Mind", "I Wanna Be With You, and "Take It to the Head"), Rihanna, Beyoncé and Mary J. Blige, among others. He frequently writes over productions by fellow Florida based production groups, such as The Runners, The Inkredibles, J.U.S.T.I.C.E. League and The Monarch.

Career

1999–2004: Career beginnings 
Cossom grew up in Orlando, Florida. An only child to a single mother – an educator and founder of a performing arts academy.  She encouraged him to perform his first solo at the age of three.  While his exposure to secular music was limited, Cossom was able to hone his skills singing in his gospel church choir.  At six, he joined his first group, a gospel act assembled by his mother and at 14, formed a short-lived singing group with friends.  From 1999–2002, Kevin fronted the Orlando-based r+b group, Nu Ground, along with Andrew (Drew) Seeley and toured all over the country.  They released an album featuring the song "My Girl, My Boo".  Three years later, he began to build a reputation as a songwriter and singer.

In 2004, after a meeting with 50 Cent at his Connecticut mansion, Cossom was asked to write and record a hook for a song that G-Unit member Lloyd Banks was working on.  This resulted in "Karma" – a hit single on Banks' debut album, The Hunger for More.  Though Cossom was replaced by Avant on the video and radio versions of the single, through this encounter, he received his first songwriting credit.

After returning home, Cossom met Orlando-based hip-hop production duo, The Runners, through a mutual DJ friend.  Within a year, they asked Cossom to assist with a song they were producing for Young Jeezy's album, The Inspiration: Thug Motivation 102.  He went on to pen the hook for Jeezy's hit single "Go Getta" featuring R. Kelly which ultimately led to Cossom securing a publishing deal with Warner/Chappell.  Through this deal, Cossom was introduced to Grammy Award-winning producer, Danja, to write for a girl group that he was producing for.  The two developed a chemistry that led to Cossom being the first artist signed to the producer's N.A.R.S. record label.

2009–present: Hook vs. Bridge, By Any Means and debut album "Hook vs. Bridge II", "Grey Area" 
Since joining forces with Danja, Cossom has gone on to lend vocals to and write and arrange for several artists throughout the music industry and most recently, has written material for Justin Bieber.

In November 2009, Cossom released Hook vs. Bridge, an extended EP with production from Danja and The Runners (among others) and features from artists including Drake, Rick Ross and Pusha T.

In March 2011, Cossom released his mixtape, By Any Means, where he teams up once again with Danja, The Runners and Rick Ross adding features from J. Cole, Ace Hood and more. On October 7, RCA Music Group announced it was disbanding Jive Records along with Arista Records and J Records.  With the shutdown, Cossom (and all other artists previously signed to these three labels) will release his future material (including his debut studio album) on the RCA Records brand.

In April 2012, Cossom released his EP, "Hook vs. Bridge II" where he teams up with producer ThLttry™ [TheLotteryMusic Group] and worked hands-on with Cossom to co-produce an EP.  The featureless "Hook vs. Bridge II" has been downloaded from popular mixtape sharing site, DatPiff, over 233,625 times and was awarded "Gold celebrated mixtape".

Discography 
Extended plays
 Hook vs. Bridge (2009)
 Hook vs. Bridge II (2012)
 Grey Area (2016)

Mixtapes
 By Any Means (2011)
  Tomorrow (2015)
  Hood Nation Boyz (WithAce Hood)  (2020)
 Highlife Cossom (2020)
 Hook Vs Bridge III (TBA)

References

External links 
 Official website

1984 births
Living people
RCA Records artists
American contemporary R&B singers
African-American male singer-songwriters
American hip hop singers
21st-century African-American male singers
Artists from Philadelphia
Singer-songwriters from Pennsylvania